David Beard (born 23 October 1973) is an Australian volleyball player, who twice competed for the Men's National Team at the Summer Olympics: Sydney 2000 and Athens 2004.

Born in Albany, Western Australia, Beard started his volleyball career at Monbulk College in 1983. Beard played as a passer or power hitter. He was the captain of the national squad for several years and competed professionally in Germany and Italy.

References

External links
 FIVB Profile

1973 births
Living people
Australian men's volleyball players
Volleyball players at the 2000 Summer Olympics
Volleyball players at the 2004 Summer Olympics
Olympic volleyball players of Australia
People from Albany, Western Australia
Sport in Albany, Western Australia